The Lomax distribution, conditionally also called the Pareto Type II distribution, is a heavy-tail probability distribution used in business, economics, actuarial science, queueing theory and Internet traffic modeling.  It is named after K. S. Lomax. It is essentially a Pareto distribution that has been shifted so that its support begins at zero.

Characterization

Probability density function 
The probability density function (pdf) for the Lomax distribution is given by

with shape parameter  and scale parameter . The density can be rewritten in such a way that more clearly shows the relation to the Pareto Type I distribution. That is:
.

Non-central moments 
The th non-central moment  exists only if the shape parameter  strictly exceeds , when the moment has the value

Related distributions

Relation to the Pareto distribution 
The Lomax distribution is a Pareto Type I distribution shifted so that its support begins at zero. Specifically:

The Lomax distribution is a Pareto Type II distribution with xm=λ and μ=0:

Relation to the generalized Pareto distribution 
The Lomax distribution is a special case of the generalized Pareto distribution. Specifically:

Relation to the beta prime distribution 
The Lomax distribution with scale parameter λ = 1 is a special case of the beta prime distribution.  If X has a Lomax distribution, then .

Relation to the F distribution 
The Lomax distribution with shape parameter α = 1 and scale parameter λ = 1 has density , the same distribution as an F(2,2) distribution.  This is the distribution of the ratio of two independent and identically distributed random variables with exponential distributions.

Relation to the q-exponential distribution 
The Lomax distribution is a special case of the q-exponential distribution. The q-exponential extends this distribution to support on a bounded interval. The Lomax parameters are given by:

Relation to the (log-) logistic distribution 
The logarithm of a Lomax(shape = 1.0, scale = λ)-distributed variable follows a logistic distribution with location log(λ) and scale 1.0.
This implies that a Lomax(shape = 1.0, scale = λ)-distribution equals a log-logistic distribution with shape β = 1.0 and scale α = log(λ).

Gamma-exponential (scale-) mixture connection 
The Lomax distribution arises as a mixture of exponential distributions where the mixing distribution of the rate is a gamma distribution.
If λ|k,θ ~ Gamma(shape = k, scale = θ) and X|λ ~ Exponential(rate = λ) then the marginal distribution of X|k,θ is Lomax(shape = k, scale = 1/θ).
Since the rate parameter may equivalently be reparameterized to a scale parameter, the Lomax distribution constitutes a scale mixture of exponentials (with the exponential scale parameter following an inverse-gamma distribution).

See also 
 power law
 compound probability distribution
 hyperexponential distribution (finite mixture of exponentials)
 normal-exponential-gamma distribution (a normal scale mixture with Lomax mixing distribution)

References

Continuous distributions
Compound probability distributions
Probability distributions with non-finite variance